This is a list of surviving Curtiss C-46 Commandos, including both airworthy and on display or stored aircraft.

Flying units
As of August 2021, there are three aircraft known to be regularly flown in active revenue service; one with Everts Air Cargo (N54514 "Maid in Japan"), and two with Buffalo Airways. In addition, there is one airworthy Museum example; Tinker Belle (N78774) which frequently takes part in Spring through Autumn airshows and museum events.  One of Everts Air Cargo, (N1822M Salmon Ella), was withdrawn from use in July 2018 after an accident, but has returned to active flight operations. Three others, (N1837M "Hot Stuff", N7848B "Dumbo" and N1651M) are in storage.  Everts also has several mothballed air-frames which they hold mainly for spare parts, but some of them could possibly be returned to service if the need arose.

On 27th February 2023, N7848B noted on a flight radar site departing from Kenai Municipal Airport, Alaska, USA

On March 13th, 2023 "Hot Stuff" was caught on FlightAware.com flying than landing at Kenai, Alaska. https://flightaware.com/live/flight/N1837M

Other airworthy units
There are several stored examples in Bolivia, however none of them are currently active. One of them (CP-1655) owned by Eco Express Cargo Services, was being brought back to serviceable condition prior to 2012, and one more (CP-973) is set up for passenger configuration, however it is reportedly now up for sale. The future use of these Bolivian examples is uncertain as the C46 has not seen any use since the crash of CP-1319 (Skyteam Flight Training) in 2012.

There is one additional stored example (C-GIBX) which is stored serviceable, but with the Certificate of Registration cancelled, at Gimli, Manitoba, Canada. This aircraft was tied up in receivership, however according to First Nations Transport, as of Jan 2016, the aircraft is claimed to be airworthy with two new engines and available for sale with the fire bottles and props needing updates.

One last example; China Doll (N53594) was airworthy and flown by the Commemorative Air Force Museum, however it is currently grounded due to Federal Aviation Administration regulations regarding propeller time as well as having corrosion issues. She was originally scheduled to be restored back to airworthy status by 2019, however the severity of the corrosion was more extensive than first thought and the funds to bring her back to serviceable condition are not currently available.

Survivors

Argentina 
 42-96729 – C-46A on static display in Loreto. It was donated to the Loreto municipality originally in 1980 to become part of an Argentina Air Force theme park. Re-located to a Public Square at Loreto (Santiago del Estero) representing the City of Loreto.

Bolivia 
 42-3638 – C-46A stored with Lineas Aereas Canedo at El Alto Airport in La Paz.
 42-107410 – C-46A stored at El Alto Airport in La Paz.
 44-77545 – C-46D stored with Lineas Aereas Canedo in Cochabamba.
 44-77898 – C-46D stored with Eco Express Charter Services at El Alto Airport in La Paz.

Brazil 
As of January 2016, the Brazilian Register lists PP-BTP PP-BTZ PP-ITE PP-NAO PP-NMH PP-VCE PT-AYA PT-LBP All show cancelled airworthiness certificates. PP-VCE & PT-LBP are confirmed preserved, PP-NMH exists derelict, however it is not known if any of the other 5 listed still survive.

 41-12381 – C-46A stored with Serviços Aéreos do Vale Amazônico in Itacoatiara.
 42-101201 – C-46A on display at the Museu Eduardo André Matarazzo, Bebedouro, São Paulo.
 43-47084 – C-46A on display at the Museu Aeroespacial in Campo dos Afonsos, Rio de Janeiro.

Canada 
According to the Transport Canada database there are four C-46's currently registered. Two are active, one is stored and one was recently withdrawn from use after crash landing in 2015. 
 44-78028 – C-46D airworthy with Buffalo Airways in Yellowknife, North West Territories. 
 44-78649 – C-46F stored with SASCO Ltd (First Nations Transportation) in Gimli, Manitoba. 
 44-78733 – C-46F airworthy with Buffalo Airways in Yellowknife, North West Territories.

China 
 4?-????? – Lushan Air Pavilion, Luyang Ranghe Zhen Airbase - Dark green with medium blue undersides, massive yellow white lightning stripe, bold yellow leading edges and red Chinese lettering on the nose. - Display
 4?-????? – Lushan Air Pavilion, Luyang Ranghe Zhen Airbase - Grey finish. - Display
 4?-????? – Chinese Air Force - China Aviation Museum, Xiaotangshanzhen, Changping, Beijing - White with light grey undersides, code faded - One of two displayed as a pair with below.
 4?-????? – Chinese Air Force - China Aviation Museum, Xiaotangshanzhen, Changping, Beijing - White with light grey undersides, code faded - Two of two displayed as a pair with above.
 4?-????? – China Civil Aviation Museum, Xie Dao, Beijing - White with light grey undersides, code faded C46A - Display

Haiti 

 41-12369 – C-46A stored at Port-au-Prince.
 42-96792 – C-46A stored at Port-au-Prince.

Honduras 
 44-78447 – C-46D fuselage stored at Tegucigalpa, Toncontin Airport.
 44-78708 – C-46F fuselage stored at Museo del Aire de Honduras.

India 
 Unknown ID – C-46 on static display outdoors at Sarsawa Air Force Station.

Israel 

 44-78628 – C-46F on static display at Atlit detainee camp Museum.

Japan 

 91-1141 – C-46D on static display at Gifu Air Field in Kakamigahara, Gifu Prefecture.
 91-1138 – C-46D on static display at Hamamatsu Air Base in Hamamatsu, Shizuoka Prefecture.
 91-1139 – C-46D on static display at Miho Air Base in Tottori Prefecture.
 91-1143 – EC-46D on static display at Tokorozawa Aviation Museum in Tokorozawa in Saitama Prefecture.
 91-1144 – C-46D nose and parts on static display at Hijiri Aviation Museum in Omi, Nagano Prefecture.
 91-1145 – EC-46D on static display at Iruma Air Base in Saitama Prefecture.
 61-1127 – C-46D on static display at Kawaguchiko Motor Museum in Kawaguchiko, Yamanashi Prefecture.
 44-78480 – C-46D nose in storage with a private collection in Tokyo Prefecture.

Mexico 
 42-101231 – C-46D on display at the Explora Museum in Leon, Guanajuato.

Philippines 
 44-78748 – C-46F cockpit only on display at Cagayan de Oro. Cut up for scrap with the wings and cockpit/nose salvaged and preserved as part of restaurant theme.

South Korea 
 44-77592 – C-46D on static display at the Korean War Memorial in Pusan.
 44-78053 – C-46D on static display at the Republic of Korea Air Force Academy in Cheongju.
 44-78541 – C-46D on static display at the War Memorial Museum in Seoul.

Taiwan 
 4?-???? – Republic of China Air Force Museum, Gangshan, Kaohsiung. Tail has the numbers stenciled C46-045 - Display

Thailand 

 44-78738 – C-46F stored at Chonburi, Thailand. Formerly located at Lad Phrao, Bangkok and set up as 'Apichart' coffee shop in 1985; moved to Chonburi 2001.
 4?-????? – C-46 stored at the Police Training Camp on Highway 22, Udon Thani, Thailand.

United States 
Airworthy
C-46D Commando
 44-77889 Maid in Japan – operated by Everts Air Cargo in Fairbanks, Alaska.
C-46F Commando
 44-78774 Tinker Belle – based at the Warriors and Warbirds Museum in Monroe, North Carolina.
On Display
C-46A Commando
 43-47350 – National Naval Aviation Museum in Pensacola, Florida.
C-46D Commando
 42-101198 – Museum of Aviation adjacent to Robins Air Force Base in Warner Robins, Georgia.
 44-77424 – Air Commando Park at Hurlburt Field near Mary Esther, Florida.
 44-77575 Honey Gal – Castle Air Museum in Atwater, California.
 44-77635 Syracuse Shackrat – Pima Air & Space Museum in Tucson, Arizona.
 44-78018 – National Museum of the United States Air Force at Wright-Patterson Air Force Base in Dayton, Ohio.
 44-78019 – Joe Davies Heritage Airpark in Palmdale, California.
C-46F Commando
 44-78573 – 82nd Airborne Division War Memorial Museum at Fort Bragg near Fayetteville, North Carolina.
 44-78663 China Doll – based at the Southern California Wing of the Commemorative Air Force in Camarillo, California.
 44-78772 – Glenn H. Curtiss Museum in Hammondsport, New York. It is on loan from the National Air and Space Museum.
Under restoration or in storage
C-46A Commando
 43-47201 Dumbo – in storage by Everts Air Cargo in Fairbanks, Alaska.

C-46D Commando
 44-77559 – in storage at the Planes of Fame Museum in Chino, California.

C-46F Commando
 43-47218 – in storage at the Yanks Air Museum in Chino, California.

 44-78495 – in storage by Everts Air Cargo in Fairbanks, Alaska.

 44-78565 Hot Stuff – in storage by Everts Air Cargo in Fairbanks, Alaska.

 44-78698 Salmon Ella – in storage by Everts Air Cargo in Fairbanks, Alaska.

References

External links
 The Survivors List - DC3PUBLISHING
 Curtiss C-46 Commando Survivors - Air-and-Space.com
 Curtis C-46 Commando Registry - Warbird Registry

Curtiss C-46 Commandos